The Linux Assigned Names and Numbers Authority (LANANA) is a central registry of names and numbers used within Linux. It was created in 2000 by H. Peter Anvin.  As of 2013, it along with Filesystem Hierarchy Standard matters had moved under the Linux Standard Base, which itself operates under Linux Foundation's auspices per Russ Herrold.

Registries 

 Linux Device List — major and minor numbers of Linux device nodes, and their standard locations in the /dev directory
 Linux Zone Unicode Assignments — code points assigned for Linux within the Private Use Area of Unicode
 several namespace registries for the Linux Standard Base

History 

The Linux Device List was created in 1992 by Rick Miller, and maintained by him until 1993. In 1995, it was adopted by H. Peter Anvin. In 2000, he created LANANA to maintain the list and other similar lists in the future. The name of the registry was a playful reference to IANA, central registry of names and numbers used in the Internet.

In 2002, LANANA became an official workgroup of the Free Standards Group.

References

External links 

 The Linux Assigned Names and Numbers Authority, archived from http://lanana.org on 16 June 2019

Standards organizations
Linux organizations